The 1937–38 Sussex County Football League season was the 18th in the history of the competition.

League table
The league featured 14 clubs, 13 which competed in the last season, along with one new club:
 East Grinstead

League table

References

1937-38
9